Loudendale is an unincorporated community in Kanawha County, West Virginia, United States.
It is located near Kanawha State Forest with access to Charleston, the state capital, by way of Pennington Hill or Coal Hollow.

References 

Unincorporated communities in West Virginia
Unincorporated communities in Kanawha County, West Virginia